Ferizli is a town and district of Sakarya Province in the Marmara region of Turkey. It has a population of 27,300. The mayor is Ismail Gundogdu (AKP).

One of the best soccer players to come out of this town—Sercan Onal

References

Populated places in Sakarya Province
Districts of Sakarya Province